is a H-game by Alicesoft.

Plot 

Sid enters a tournament. Shortly after he is crowned champion, the fallen Angel Aquross infects him with a hideous disease that requires him to steal the life energy of Angels or be in constant pain. The only relief lies in a drug that kills the pain, but causes sexual urges that cannot be denied. Now, Sid must defeat the evil Aquross.

OVA 

It was condensed into a single 35-minute episode and released in the US as a subtitled white-cassette VHS by Pink Pineapple studio.

Episodes

Theme songs

 "Yume no Image" by Konami Yoshida

Cast

Reception 
Mike Toole comparing the OVA to Gor did not find it very interesting. Chris Beveridge commented that the video "is a strange piece" and has "some good fun moments".

References

External links 

English
 

Japanese
 alicesoft
 Imageepoch
 pinkpineapple

1997 anime OVAs
Eroge
Fantasy anime and manga
Hentai anime and manga
OVAs based on video games
Pink Pineapple
NEC PC-9801 games
FM Towns games
Windows games
MSX2 games
Nintendo 3DS games
X68000 games